Richard Tate or Tait may refer to:

Richard Tait (footballer) (born 1989), footballer
Richard Tait (born 1947), British academic and journalist
Richard Tate, character in Outcasts

See also
Dick Tate, Kentucky politician